Dragomir Vukobratović (Serbian Cyrillic: Драгомир Вукобратовић; born 12 May 1988) is a Serbian footballer.

Club career
Vukobratović came up through the ranks at FK Vojvodina.

References

External links
 Dragomir Vukobratović Stats at Utakmica.rs
 

1988 births
Living people
Sportspeople from Karlovac
Serbs of Croatia
Serbian footballers
Serbia youth international footballers
Serbian expatriate footballers
FK Vojvodina players
FK Voždovac players
NK Osijek players
OFK Beograd players
Górnik Łęczna players
Red Star Belgrade footballers
FC Orenburg players
FCI Levadia Tallinn players
FC Novokuznetsk players
FK Radnik Surdulica players
FK Proleter Novi Sad players
Ermis Aradippou FC players
Ekstraklasa players
Serbian SuperLiga players
Meistriliiga players
Croatian Football League players
Kazakhstan Premier League players
Premier League of Bosnia and Herzegovina players
Association football midfielders
Croatian emigrants to Serbia
Expatriate footballers in Russia
Expatriate footballers in Kazakhstan
Expatriate footballers in Poland
Expatriate footballers in Estonia
Expatriate footballers in Croatia
Expatriate footballers in Bosnia and Herzegovina
Expatriate footballers in Cyprus
Serbian expatriate sportspeople in Russia
Serbian expatriate sportspeople in Kazakhstan
Serbian expatriate sportspeople in Poland
Serbian expatriate sportspeople in Estonia
Serbian expatriate sportspeople in Croatia
Serbian expatriate sportspeople in Bosnia and Herzegovina
Serbian expatriate sportspeople in Cyprus